The Town of Sanderson is not a town as such, but an area of land within the Municipality of Darwin and contains a number of suburbs Anula, Wulagi, Karama and Malak.

Present day
The Town of Sanderson was proclaimed in 1972 for the area to the east of Lee Point Road in Darwin's northern suburbs.

History
The Hundred of Sanderson was proclaimed in 1879 for the area of Lee Point and Shoal Bay near Port Darwin and is believed to be named after Frederick James Sanderson, SM JP who entered the public service as a clerk in July 1854, aged 20. In 1862, Sanderson was appointed Secretary to the Land Titles Commissioner and Secretary to the Attorney-General in December 1870. He was the first Commissioner of Patents and in 1878 was appointed as Collector of Customs and Chief Inspector of Distilleries in 1879. In 1888, he was appointed President of the Marine Board as well as Collector of Customs. He died in 1903, aged 69 years.

In 1963, the Governor-general was asked to revoke the Hundred of Sanderson and to include the area in the Hundred of Bagot. The then Minister for Territories requested that Sanderson's name be preserved in some way.

References

External links

Suburbs of Darwin, Northern Territory
History of the Northern Territory
1972 establishments in Australia